Thomas Fletcher (1852 – after 1894) was a farmer and political figure in British Columbia. He represented Alberni in the Legislative Assembly of British Columbia from 1890 to 1894.

He was born in Simcoe County, Ontario, the son of the Reverend Canon Fletcher.

References 

1852 births
Year of death uncertain
Independent MLAs in British Columbia
19th-century Canadian politicians